Paul Gooch is an American make-up artist. He was nominated for an Academy Award in the category Best Makeup and Hairstyling for the film Maleficent: Mistress of Evil.

Selected filmography 
 Maleficent: Mistress of Evil (2019; co-nominated with Arjen Tuiten and David White)

References

External links 

Living people
Year of birth missing (living people)
Place of birth missing (living people)
American make-up artists
Best Makeup BAFTA Award winners